Hughley Barker (27 June 1925 – April 1994) was a Barbadian cricketer. He played in four first-class matches for the Barbados cricket team from 1951 to 1956.

See also
 List of Barbadian representative cricketers

References

External links
 

1925 births
1994 deaths
Barbadian cricketers
Barbados cricketers
People from Saint Michael, Barbados